Big Brother Greece 4 also known as Big Mother, was the fourth season of the Greek reality television series Big Brother. The show followed thirty-one contestants, known as housemates, who were isolated from the outside world for an extended period of time in a custom-built house. Each week, one or more of the housemates were evicted by a public vote.

At the beginning of the season, Big Brother Greece 4 launched under the name Big Mother on ANT1 on October 3, 2005 and ended on December 29, 2005, lasted 88 days. It featured a new format and was known as "Big Mother". In Big Mother, the nine housemates take part in the game with their mothers, with whom they must coexist during the contest. The "mamas" were not able to win the prize but they would stay with their children until their eviction. When a housemate is evicted, their mother must also leave the house. However, this proved to be a failure with the show's audience and the show's name switched back to Big Brother and use the traditional format in mid-season.

Despite the switch back to the traditional format, ratings still did not meet expectations and ANT1 decided to abandon the Big Brother franchise. The last remaining housemate, Nikos Papadopoulos, was declared the winner, winning a cash prize of €200,000.

The show presented by Tatiana Stefanidou.

Housemates

Nominations table

 Housemate was exempt
 Housemate was Head of household (Weeks 5 -12) or Big Mother (Weeks 1-4)

References

2005 Greek television seasons
04